Badangpet is a satellite city of Hyderabad located in Rangareddy district of Telangana, India. It is one of the 13 Municipal Corporations in Telangana. This is a newly constituted as Municipal Corporation from Nagar Panchayat which was formed on 26-03-2013. It is formed duly merging (8) erstwhile villages i.e 1. Badangpet 2. Almasguda 3. Nadergul 4. Kurmalguda 5. Gurramguda 6. Balapur (part) 7. Venkatapur and 8. Mamidipally. The area of the ULB is 74.56 Sq. Km. Population as per as per 2011 Census is 64579 and presently it is estimated to 100000 population.

Badangpet is located in the vicinity of GHMC ie., Hyderabad city which is also the capital city of Telangana State. Initially developed as a residential hub with a very fast increase in population. (938 ft).

The name Badangpet came from a ruler named Badangi who ruled this area in the Deccan sultanate period. The old village has beautiful historical monuments such as button Gutta [ Watchtower ] Fort walls and ancient shiva-Vishnu temple named Kasi Bugga.

References

Municipal corporations in Telangana